

The Secretary of the Commonwealth is a member of the Virginia Governor's Cabinet. The office is currently held by secretary Kay Coles James.

Duties of the Secretary of the Commonwealth
 Serving as the Keeper of the Seal of the Commonwealth
 Assisting the Governor in the appointment of thousands of individuals to serve on state boards and commissions
 Issuing the Commissions of Notaries Public
 Authenticating documents
 Registering lobbyists
 Issuing the "Bluebook," officially "The Report of the Secretary of the Commonwealth," an annual publication that identifies, "(a) the boards of visitors of all public institutions, and other boards appointed by the Governor; (b) all commissions issued under appointments made by the Governor, except commissions to notaries public; (c) all departments, boards, councils, commissions, and other collegial bodies created in the executive branch of state government; and (d) such other matters as the Governor requires." – The Report as defined by the Code of Virginia 
 Issuing a State Government Organization Chart
 Handling pardons and clemencies, restoration of civil rights of former felons, extradition, and service of process. Although the Secretary is involved, the Governor is responsible for granting pardons, clemency, and restorations of rights, as well as authorizing extradition. The Secretary of the Commonwealth's Office handles the paperwork on behalf of the Governor.

In a unique twist of Virginia law, unlike other members of the Governor's Cabinet, the Secretary of the Commonwealth does not resign immediately upon the inauguration of a new Governor, but remains in office for an additional week, serving a fixed term of four years, in order to ensure a smooth transition and ensure continuity in government.

History
Although the office has evolved over the years, the job has always involved the safekeeping of the Great Seal of the Commonwealth of Virginia. Under the Virginia Constitution of 1901, the Secretary of the Commonwealth was an elected post, along with the Governor, Lieutenant Governor, and Attorney General. Under Virginia's current constitution, enacted in 1971, and with the creation of the Governor's Cabinet during the administration of Governor A. Linwood Holton Jr., the Secretary of the Commonwealth has been an appointed member of the Governor's Cabinet.

Partial list of secretaries of the Commonwealth
 John Harvie (1788-1789)
 George W. Munford (1852–1864)
 Garrick Mallery (Union occupation)
 Joseph T. Lawless (1894–1900)
 David Q. Eggleston (1901–1909)
 B. O. James (1909–1927)
 Martin A. Hutchinson (1927–1930)
 Peter H. Saunders (1930–1938)
 Raymond L. Jackson (1938–1942)
 Ralph E. Wilkins (1942–1945)
 Jesse W. Dillon (1946–1948)
 M. W. Armistead III (1948)
 Thelma Y. Gordon (1948–1952)
 Martha Bell Conway (1952–1970)
 Cynthia Newman (1970–1974)
 Patricia R. Perkinson (1974–1978)
 Stanford Parris (1978)
 Frederick T. Gray, Jr. (1978–1981)
 Laurie Naismith (1982–1985)
 H. Benson Dendy III (1985–1986)
 Sandra Bowen (1986–1990)
 Pamela M. Womack (1990–1993)
 Scott Bates (1993)
 Ruby Grant Martin (1993–1994)
 Betsy Davis Beamer (1994–1998)
 Anne Petera (1998–2002)
 Anita Rimler (2002–2006)
 Katherine Hanley (2006–2010)
 Janet Vestal Kelly (2010–2014)
 Levar Stoney (2014–2016)
 Kelly Thomasson (2016–2022)
 Kay Coles James (2022–present)

References
Notes

Bibliography

External links
Official Website of the Secretary of the Commonwealth
Code of Virginia regarding the Appointment and Term of Office of the Secretary of the Commonwealth
Code of Virginia regarding the Duties of the Secretary of the Commonwealth

Archival Records
A Guide to the Records of the Secretary of the Commonwealth, 1996–2006 at The Library of Virginia
Archived Web Site of the Secretary of the Commonwealth, 2006–2010 part of Governor Timothy Kaine Administration Collection, 2006–2010 at Virginia Memory
Archived Web Site of the Secretary of the Commonwealth, 2005–2006 part of Virginia's Political Landscape, Fall 2005 at Virginia Memory

 
Commonwealth